"Brand New" is the first single from Rhymefest's debut album, Blue Collar, which features rapper and producer Kanye West. It is a hip hop song, which charted in both Ireland and the United Kingdom in 2006. The music video was directed by DavMeyer.

Background
The music video was released on October 5, 2005, and directed by Dave Meyers. Nick Cannon revealed to have ghostwrote part of West's verse in November 2016, but pointed out that West is a guy who's like: 'If somebody say something dope, let's get to it.'.

Track listing
CD single (Europe)
 "Brand New" (Radio) – 3:39
 "Brand New" (Main) – 3:40
 "Brand New" (Instrumental) – 3:39
 "These Days" – 3:40
 "Brand New" (Video) – 3:39

12" single (UK)
 "Brand New" (Main) – 3:40
 "Brand New" (Radio) – 3:39
 "Brand New" (Instrumental) – 3:39

Charts

References

External links

2005 singles
2005 songs
Kanye West songs
Music videos directed by Dave Meyers (director)
Song recordings produced by Kanye West
Songs written by Kanye West
Songs written by Rhymefest